Amylonotus is a genus of mushrooms in the family Auriscalpiaceae. It was first described by Norwegian mycologist Leif Ryvarden in 1975.

References

External links

Russulales
Russulales genera
Taxa named by Leif Ryvarden